Kieran Morrison (born 1975) is an Irish retired hurler who played as a full-forward for the Cork senior team.

Born in Conna, County Cork, Morrison first arrived on the inter-county scene at the age of seventeen when he first linked up with the Cork minor team, before later joining the under-21 side. He made his senior debut during the 1995 championship. Morrisson had a brief career, winning one National Hurling League medal. He also won a set of All-Ireland and Munster medals as a non-playing substitute.

At club level Morrison played Senior Club Hurling with St Catherine's for 14 years (1994-2008) and is a two-time intermediate championship medallist with St Catherine's.

Career statistics

Club

Honours

Team

University College Cork
Fitzgibbon Cup (1): 1996, 1997 (captain), 1998

St Catherine's
Cork Intermediate Hurling Championship (1): 1994, 2004

Cork
All-Ireland Senior Hurling Championship (1): 1999 (sub)
Munster Senior Hurling Championship (1): 1999 (sub)
National Hurling League (1): 1998
Munster Under-21 Hurling Championship (1): 1996
Munster Intermediate Hurling Championship (1): 2005
All-Ireland Junior Hurling Championship (1): 1994

References

1975 births
Living people
St Catherine's hurlers
UCC hurlers
Cork inter-county hurlers